Dharamvir Singh (born 5 August 1990) represented India in Men's Hockey during the 2012 London Olympics. He was part of the Indian team that won the silver medal at the 2014 Commonwealth Games.

He supports Indian Collegiate Athletic Program (ICAP) and has agreed to be a mentor for Hockey.

References

External links 
 
 

1990 births
Living people
Field hockey players from Chandigarh
Field hockey players at the 2012 Summer Olympics
Olympic field hockey players of India
Asian Games medalists in field hockey
Field hockey players at the 2010 Asian Games
Field hockey players at the 2014 Asian Games
Asian Games gold medalists for India
Asian Games bronze medalists for India
Commonwealth Games silver medallists for India
Field hockey players at the 2014 Commonwealth Games
Indian male field hockey players
Commonwealth Games medallists in field hockey
Medalists at the 2010 Asian Games
Medalists at the 2014 Asian Games
2014 Men's Hockey World Cup players
Medallists at the 2014 Commonwealth Games